Charles, Count of Charolais may refer to:

Charles the Bold, Count of Charolais from 1433 and Duke of Burgundy from 1467
Charles V, Holy Roman Emperor, Count of Charolais from 1530 to 1558
Charles III of Spain, Count of Charolais from 1665 to 1684
Charles de Bourbon, Count of Charolais from 1710 to 1760